The Ven.  Richard Brooke, J.P. (1840–1926) was Archdeacon of The Cape from 1905 to 1926.

Brooke was educated at the University of the Cape and ordained  Deacon in 1864 and Priest in 1865. He was a Tutor at the Diocesan College until 1866 when he became Rector of Philippolis. After further incumbencies at Clanwilliam and Claremont he became Principal of the Diocesan College. In 1901 he became Rector of Kalk Bay.

He died on 4 April 1926 at Rondebosch. His son  was Dean of Cape Town from 1932 to 1947.

Notes

1840 births
University of South Africa alumni
19th-century South African Anglican priests
20th-century South African Anglican priests
Archdeacons of The Cape
1926 deaths